The 1st constituency of New Caledonia is a French legislative constituency in New Caledonia.

Between 1958 and 1962, the constituency represented the entirety of the New Hebrides condominium and the constituency represented the entirety of New Caledonia until a redistricting in 1978 created the 2nd constituency. Between 1978 and a new redistricting in 1986, the first constituency represented the Kanak-populated eastern shore of the main island in addition to the Loyalty Islands. Since 1986, the constituency is composed of the Caldoche-populated loyalist  stronghold of Nouméa and the strongly nationalist Kanak-populated Loyalty Islands. Due to this makeup in which loyalist-voting Nouméa far outnumbers the sparsely populated islands, the constituency is strongly loyalist.

Deputies

Election results

2022

2017

2012

2007

References

Sources
 Official results of French elections from 1998: 

French legislative constituencies
French legislative constituencies in New Caledonia